Mitchell–Ward House, also known as Snow Hill, is a historic farmhouse located near Belvidere, Perquimans County, North Carolina.   It was built about 1832, and is a two-story, three bay, double pile frame dwelling with Federal style design elements.  It has a side gable roof, is sheathed in weatherboard, and rests on a brick pier foundation.  Also on the property is a detached kitchen (c. 1832).

The house was added to the National Register of Historic Places in 1999.

References

Houses on the National Register of Historic Places in North Carolina
Federal architecture in North Carolina
Houses completed in 1832
Houses in Perquimans County, North Carolina
National Register of Historic Places in Perquimans County, North Carolina